Leonard Staughton Hutchinson (14 April 1901 – 2 October 1976) was an English cricketer. Hutchinson was a right-handed batsman whose bowling style is unknown. He was born at Anstey, Leicestershire.

Hutchinson made his first-class debut for Leicestershire against Derbyshire in the 1923 County Championship at the Bath Grounds, Ashby-de-la-Zouch. He made seven further first-class appearances for the county, the last of which came against Essex in the 1925 County Championship. He struggled with the bat in his eight first-class matches, scoring a total of 65 runs at an average of 4.64, with a high score of 14, while with the ball he took a single wicket.

He died at Glenfield, Leicestershire on 2 October 1976.

References

External links
Leonard Hutchinson at ESPNcricinfo
Leonard Hutchinson at CricketArchive

1901 births
1976 deaths
People from Anstey, Leicestershire
Cricketers from Leicestershire
English cricketers
Leicestershire cricketers